Érika MacDavid (born 15 December 1970) is a former synchronized swimmer from Brazil.

References 

1970 births
Living people
Brazilian synchronized swimmers
Olympic synchronized swimmers of Brazil
Synchronized swimmers at the 1988 Summer Olympics